Purple Saturn Day is a space-themed Olympic sports game. It was created in by ERE Informatique and published by Epyx in 1989.

Gameplay
The game features four non-existent sci-fi themed Olympic games, in the vein of Epyx games like Summer Games (1984). The four events are Ring Chase, Tronic Slider, Brain Bowler, and Time Jump. The events can be practiced on their own, or played one after another in tournament mode, where if the player wins they get to see the queen of the tournament do a short dance around a pole.

Reception
ST/Amiga Format magazine gave the game high praise, awarding it a review score of 98%, and included a demo of the game on the magazine's coverdisk.

References

External links
Purple Saturn Day at Atari Mania
Purple Saturn Day at Amiga Hall of Light
Purple Saturn Day at Spectrum Computing

1989 video games
Amiga games
Amstrad CPC games
Atari ST games
DOS games
Epyx games
Single-player video games
Video games developed in France
ZX Spectrum games